Diaphus adenomus, the Gilbert's large lantern fish, is a species of lanternfish found worldwide.

Size

References

Myctophidae
Taxa named by Charles Henry Gilbert
Fish described in 1905